Frank Sapareto (born January 12, 1960) is an American politician who served in the New Hampshire House of Representatives from 1996 to 2002, 2008 to 2014 and 2016 to 2018. He previously served in the New Hampshire Senate from the 19th district from 2002 to 2004.

References

1960 births
Living people
Republican Party members of the New Hampshire House of Representatives
Republican Party New Hampshire state senators